Gugux is a town in the Sahil region of Somaliland.

See also

References

Gugux

Populated places in Sahil, Somaliland